Salil may refer to:

Salil Ankola (born 1968), former Indian cricketer
Salil Chaturvedi, director of Indian apparel brand Provogue and a former sailing champion
Salil Chowdhury (1922–1995), famous Hindi and Bengali composer, poet and a playwright
Salil Oberoi (born 1983), English cricketer
Salil Shetty, Indian United Nations official, next Secretary-General of Amnesty International
Salil al-Sawarim, a nasheed by ISIS